Edwin Denison Morgan III (October 19, 1854 – June 13, 1933) was an American yachtsman during the turn of the 19th century.

Early life 
Born in 1854 as Alfred Waterman Morgan, he was grandson of New York governor Edwin D. Morgan, and a distant relative of J.P. Morgan. He graduated from Harvard College in 1877. He changed his name to Edwin Denison Morgan III at the request of his grandfather after the premature death of his father Edwin Denison Morgan II. After college, he became a highly successful businessman, and was the founder of Nassau Light and Power, a shareholder in many significant livestock interests, and president, at the beginning of the 1900s of mining companies the Corralitos Company and Candelaria Mining Co in Mexico.

Notable Residences

Beacon Rock 
Summer residence, nicknamed the "Acropolis of Newport"  completed around 1890 in Newport, Rhode Island for Morgan, and designed by architect  Stanford White of Mckim Mead & White. With deep water at both sides of the peninsula in Bretons Cove, he kept his large yacht Constellation, along with the smaller racing yachts he owned while residing there.

Wheatly 

Residence in Old Westbury, Long Island, NY, it was built over a 10-year period, and designed by architect firm McKim, Mead & White.

Yachtsman 
E.D. Morgan was rear commodore 1887–8, vice commodore 1891-2 and commodore 1923-4 of the New York Yacht Club. He was part of the winning team of the America's Cup Yacht Race in 1901 aboard the yacht Columbia. He had a close relationship with yacht designer Nathaniel Herreshoff, who designed many yachts for him. He also commissioned the construction of the largest steel hull schooner of the time, the Constellation, designed by Edward Burgess. Over his lifetime he owned over 17 vessels, ranging from steamers to schooners.

References 

1854 births
1933 deaths
Harvard College alumni
Members of the New York Yacht Club